Salvatore Giardina (born 3 June 1981) is an Italian footballer.

Biography
Born in Catania, Sicily, Giardina started his career with Eccellenza Sicily team Belpasso. He then played for  Acireale. In 2002, he left for Serie D team Rossanese and in 2003 signed by Serie C2 club Gela. In 2005, he was signed by Serie A club Chievo along with Matías Claudio Cuffa. Chievo farmed both players to Serie C1 club Pisa in co-ownership deal. In June 2006 Chievo bought back both players and loaned Giardina to Serie C1 team Sassuolo. In July 2007, Giardina reunited Cuffa at Serie C2 club PortoSummaga, which Giardina joined the club in co-ownership deal. He follow the team promoted to Prima Divisione in 2008 and the team also bought him outright in June 2008. He was released on 1 July 2009. In August, he left for fellow Prima Divisione team Cosenza. In August 2010, he returned to Gela.

References

External links
 Gela Profile 
 Football.it Profile 

Italian footballers
S.S.D. Città di Gela players
Pisa S.C. players
U.S. Sassuolo Calcio players
A.S.D. Portogruaro players
Cosenza Calcio players
U.S. Alessandria Calcio 1912 players
Association football midfielders
Footballers from Catania
1981 births
Living people
Footballers from Sicily